The 2015–16 Division 1 was the 40th season of the  UAE Division 1. 9 teams took part, each playing each other twice, home and away, for a total of 16 games. Hatta were the inaugural champions.

Stadia and locations

''Note: Table lists clubs in alphabetical order.

Personnel and kits

Note: Flags indicate national team as has been defined under FIFA eligibility rules. Players may hold more than one non-FIFA nationality.

League table

References

Division 1
UAE